Courcelles-sous-Moyencourt (literally Courcelles under Moyencourt) is a commune in the northern French department of Somme.

Geography

Population

See also
 Communes of the Somme department

References

Communes of Somme (department)